Scinax juncae is a species of frog in the family Hylidae. It is endemic to Brazil.

Description
The adult male frog measures 23.0 to 27.1 mm in snout-vent length. It has a yellowish stripe across its face and green-brown skin on the dorsum with yellow-green stripes. Its head is larger than its body.

Habitat
This frog lives in forests and nearby open areas near with bodies of water such as springs, ponds, and streams. The frogs were found while singing, seated on shrubs.

Taxonomy
Scientists named this frog after a herpetologist Dr. Flora Acuña Juncá.

References

Frogs of South America
Amphibians described in 2010
juncae